Anticoli Corrado is a  (municipality) in the Metropolitan City of Rome in the Italian region of Latium, located about  northeast of Rome.

Anticoli Corrado borders the following municipalities: Mandela, Marano Equo, Rocca Canterano, Roviano, Saracinesco.

Anticoli became known in the 19th century because its young inhabitants used to pose as models for the community of artists living near Piazza di Spagna in Rome. Some artists eventually went to see the birthplace of their models and found Anticoli a very picturesque site to the point of living there for some time. The town attracted artists until World War II.

Stanley Kramer's The Secret of Santa Vittoria (1969) was almost entirely shot here.

Main sights
Church of St. Peter (11th century)
Palazzo Baronale (17th century)
Piazza delle Ville, with a fountain by Arturo Martini
Civic Museum of Modern Art, housing works by artists connected to the town, such as Oscar Kokoschka, Felice Carena, Paolo Salvati, Edita Broglio and Emanuele Cavalli.

Twin towns
 Arcos de la Frontera, Spain

References

Cities and towns in Lazio
Hilltowns in Lazio
Articles which contain graphical timelines